The Boxer from Shantung is a 1972 Hong Kong kung fu film directed by Chang Cheh and Pao Hsueh-li, and starring Chen Kuan-tai, Ching Li and guest stars David Chiang.

Plot 
Boxer from Shantung follows Ma Yongzhen and Xiao Jiangbei. Ma and Xiao are manual laborers busting their tails in Shanghai at the beginning of the film, and Ma's first encounter with the crime lord Tan Si - who shares power in the city with Boss Yang, who has the Four Champions fighting for him - starts him off on the underworld influence ladder. Step by step, he earns the respect of everyone he meets, either with his strength of character or by beating them up. When he gets a really big break by defeating a Russian strongman, he indulges himself in a fancy cigarette holder, much like the one Tan Si uses. However, he is mindful of his humble beginnings, and of the fact that times are still tough for many in Shanghai. He shares his good fortune with his old fellow wage slaves, and when they assist him in his various extralegal activities, he lectures them on the futility of trying to extort money from people who simply don't have any to spare.

The tea house that Ma and his underlings frequent employs a singer, Jin Lingzi, and her uncle, who provides the music. Ms. Jin's hopes that Ma's arrival will mark a turn for the better for conditions in the crime-plagued city are dashed when she ascertains that he isn't different enough from the other bosses she's seen rise and fall. She begins contemplating leaving the city.

Tan Si is ambushed and killed by Boss Yang. Ma finds Tan Si's body and is subsequently invited by Boss Yang to discuss business in a restaurant. Ma's followers warn him that Ma might be ambushed during the meeting. Ma decides to go anyway. He calls his friend and cart driver Xiao Jiangbei, gives him 100 dollars to leave the city as he is worried about his friend, who is too friendly and naive for the gangster lifestyle. In the restaurant, Yang has all the waiters and customers thrown out and replaces them with his own men. Ma arrives, observes the situation and slowly starts the conversation with Yang. He quickly tells Yang that he only came to the meeting to kill Yang. Suddenly the men Yang had placed in the restaurant start attacking Ma und hurt him with an Axe, that gets stuck in his torso. Despite his injury Ma - with the help of his own men, who arrived to help their boss - fights all of Yang's men and incapacitates them -including the four champions. Ma then kills Yang. One of Yang's men, who has survived the fight, attacks Ma and kills him. Ma's killer is then finished off by Ma's men.

The film ends with Jin Lingzi, her uncle and Xiao Jiangbei leaving Shanghai on a train.

Cast
Chen Kuan-tai as Ma Yongzhen
Ching Li as Jin Lingzi
David Chiang as Boss Tan Si (guest star)
Cheng Kang-yeh as Xiao Jiangbei
Chiang Nan as Boss Yang
Fung Ngai as Fang Ah-gen
Ku Feng as Chang Chin-fa
Tin Ching as Li Caishun
Wong Ching as Lu Pu
Mario Milano as Russian muscleman
Chan Ho as Jin Lingzi's uncle
Lee Man-tai as Innkeeper
Liu Wai as Horse carriage maker
Shum Lo as Tea house owner
Bruce Tong as One of Ma's men
Leung Seung-wan as One of Ma's men
Wong Chung as One of Tan Si's men
Wang Kuang-yu as One of Tan Si's men
Fung Hak-on as Tan Si's coachman
Tang Tak-cheung as Russian muscleman's challenger
Yen Shi-kwan as Russian muscleman's challenger
Wong Pui-kei as Russian muscleman's challenger
Hsu Hsia as One of Ma's men
Wong Mei as One of Ma's men
Ling Hon as One of Ma's men
 as One of Ma's men
Yuen Yat-cho as One of Ma's men
Yuan Man-tzu as Prostitute
Chin Tsi-ang as Brothel mamasan
Bai Yu as Brothel mamasan
Kam Tin-chue as Brothel boss
Fuk Yan-cheng as Brothel boss
Cho Kin as Tea house waiter
Chu Kai as Yang's thug
Cheung Siu-lun as Casino manager
Lo Wai as Tan's man
Kot Ping as Brothel mamasan
Lee Chiu as Tan's man
Ng Yuen-fan as Tan's man
Ho Bo-sing as Tan's man
Yeung Pak-chan as Tan's man
Chan Chuen as Yang's thug
Tung Choi-bo as Yang's thug
Danny Chow as Yang's thug
Huang Ha as Yang's thug
Chik Ngai-hung as Yang's thug
Chu Fat as Yang's thug
Wynn Lau as Yang's thug
Dick Chan as Yang's thug
Wan Fat as Yang's thug
Yuen Shun-yee as Yang's thug
Alan Chan as Yang's thug
Ko Hung as Yang's thug
Ho Pak-kwoing as Yang's thug
Wong Chi-keung as Yang's thug
Philip Ko as Yang's thug
Brandy Yuen as Yang's thug
Lee Hang as Yang's thug
Tam Bo as Yang's thug
Law Keung as Yang's thug
Lai Yan as Yang's thug
Chan Siu-kai as Yang's thug
Chui Kin-wa as Yang's thug
San Kuai as Yang's thug
Tino Wong as Yang's thug
San Sin as Yang's thug
Yuen Cheung-yan as Yang's thug
Yuen Woo-ping as Yang's thug
King Chuen as Yang's thug
Hung Ling-ling as Casino waitress
Ting Tung as Horse carriage worker
Yi Fung as Train passenger
Sai Gwa-Pau as Wrestling spectator
Tsang Choh-lam as Wrestling spectator
Chu Yau-ko as Wrestling spectator
Wong Yuet-ting as Wrestling spectator
Wong Kung-miu as Wrestling spectator
Lam Yuen as Wrestling spectator
Chan Ho-cheung as Wrestling spectator
Chai Lam as Casino gambler
Kwan Yan as Casino gambler
Tony Lee as Casino gambler
Cheng Sek-au as Casino gambler
Cheng Chok-chow as Wrestling spectator

See also
 Hero, a 1997 remake, starring Takeshi Kaneshiro as Ma Yongzhen
 Master Ma, a 1998 Hong Kong-Taiwanese television series about Ma Yongzhen, starring Kenny Ho
 Once Upon a Time in Shanghai, a 2014 loose remake, with time setting changed to 1930s, starring Philip Ng as Ma Yongzhen

External links 
 
 
 Boxer From Shantung at Hong Kong Cinemagic

1970s action films
1972 films
1972 martial arts films
1970s Mandarin-language films
Shaw Brothers Studio films
Hong Kong action films
Hong Kong martial arts films
Kung fu films
Films directed by Chang Cheh
Films set in Shanghai
Triad films
1970s Hong Kong films